is a Japanese professional basketball player who plays for the Shimane Susanoo Magic of the B.League in Japan. His nickname is "Hama". On April 13, 2019, he scored 21 points in a win to the Levanga Hokkaido. He and Chanson V-Magic player, Satomi Ochiai have registered their marriage in June 2019. He has been appointed the new captain of the team in August 2019.

Career statistics

Regular season 

|-
| align="left" | NBL 2013–14
| align="left" | Aisin
| 3 || 0 || 5.3 || 40.0 || 0 || – || 0.0 || 0.0 || 0.0 || 0.0 || 1.3
|-
| align="left"  style="background-color:#afe6ba; border: 1px solid gray" | NBL 2014–15†
| align="left" | Aisin
| 37 || 0 || 6.8 || 41.7 || 18.2 || 66.7 || 0.6 || 0.4 || 0.3 || 0.1 || 1.8
|-
| align="left" | NBL 2015–16
| align="left" | Aisin
| 24 || 0 || 2.8 || 40.9 || 25.0 || 33.3 || 0.1 || 0.1 || 0.0 || 0.0 || 0.9
|-
| style="background-color:#FFCCCC" align="left" | 2016–17
| align="left" | Akita

| 43 || 42 || 23.4 || 39.3 || 38.4 || 67.3|| 2.4 || 1.7 || 0.8 || 0.2 || 6.0
|-
| align="left" | 2017–18
| align="left" | Akita
| 57 ||42  ||19.7  || 43.5 ||36.3  ||55.8  || 2.9 || 1.8 ||1.4  ||0.3  || 8.0
|-
| align="left" | 2018–19
| align="left" | Akita
| 57 ||37 || 23.7  || 38.2 ||31.7  ||72.2 || 2.1 || 2.3 ||0.9  ||0.2|| 5.8
|-
| align="left" | 2019–20
| align="left" | Akita
| 32 ||11 || 17.8  || 38.5 ||22.2  ||60.0 || 1.8 ||1.6 ||0.8  ||0.2|| 3.8
|-
|- class="sortbottom"
! style="text-align:center;" colspan=2| Career 
! 253 ||132  || 17.3 || 40.5 || 33.2 || 63.2 || 1.9 || 1.5 || 0.8 ||0.2 || 5.0
|-

Playoffs 

|-
|style="text-align:left;"|2014–15
|style="text-align:left;"|Aisin
| 4 ||  ||4.5 || .400 || .000 || .000 || 0.5 || 0.5 || 0.0 || 0.0 || 1.0
|-
|style="text-align:left;"|2017–18
|style="text-align:left;"|Akita
| 5 || 3 || 15:19 || .424 || .400 || .500 || 1.6 || 2.8 || 0.8 || 0 || 7.0
|-

Early cup games 

|-
|style="text-align:left;"|2017
|style="text-align:left;"|Akita
| 2 || 0 || 18:40 || .667 || .500 || 1.000 || 3.5 || 1.5 || 1.5 || 0.0 || 14.0
|-
|style="text-align:left;"|2019
|style="text-align:left;"|Akita
| 2 || 2 || 25:17 || .364 || .250 || .500 || 0.5 || 2.0 || 0.5 || 0.0|| 5.0
|-

Preseason games

|-
| align="left" |2018
| align="left" | Akita
| 2 || 2 || 18.9 || .200 ||.000  || .000||1.5 || 2.5|| 1.0 || 0.3 ||  2.0
|-
| align="left" |2019
| align="left" | Akita
| 3 || 1 || 18.7 || .462 ||.500  || .500||0.7 || 3.3|| 2.0 || 0.3 ||  5.3
|-

Source: Changwon1Changwon2
Source: UtsunomiyaToyamaSendai

Trivia

He wears glasses off the court.
The Nikkan Sports and Sports Hochi reported that Shirahama looks like stars, Haruma Miura and Dean Fujioka.
He wanted to become a physiotherapist when he was in high school.

References

External links 
 
Video

1991 births
Living people
Akita Northern Happinets players
Forwards (basketball)
Japanese men's basketball players
SeaHorses Mikawa players
Sportspeople from Saga Prefecture